The British Empire Trophy was a motor race in the United Kingdom. Since its inception in 1932, the Empire Trophy was hosted at five different circuits and awarded for ten separate racing categories. The race was run a total of 42 times, spanning over eight decades, making it one of the longest running and most prestigious racing events.

History

Winners by year

Race history by circuit

References

External links
 British Empire Trophy - 1932-1992
 1949 British Empire Trophy
 1950 British Empire Trophy
 XII British Empire Trophy

 
Formula One non-championship races
Auto races in the United Kingdom